Luca Ariatti (born 27 December 1978 in Reggio Emilia) is a former Italian footballer who played as a defender.

External links
Profil na football.co.uk

1978 births
Living people
Italian footballers
A.C. Reggiana 1919 players
Atalanta B.C. players
Ascoli Calcio 1898 F.C. players
ACF Fiorentina players
U.S. Lecce players
A.C. ChievoVerona players
Delfino Pescara 1936 players
Serie A players
Serie B players
Serie C players
Association football defenders
Association football utility players
Sportspeople from Reggio Emilia
Footballers from Emilia-Romagna